Events from the year 1974 in Portuguese Macau.

Incumbents
 Governor - José Manuel de Sousa e Faro Nobre de Carvalho, José Eduardo Martinho Garcia Leandro

Events

October
 5 October - The opening of Governador Nobre de Carvalho Bridge.

References

 
Years of the 20th century in Macau
Macau
Macau
1970s in Macau